Salah Payahs (also Romanized as Şalāḩ Payahs; also known as Şalāḩ Payahsī) is a village in Abish Ahmad Rural District, Abish Ahmad District, Kaleybar County, East Azerbaijan Province, Iran. At the 2006 census, its population was 177, in 33 families.

References 

Populated places in Kaleybar County